The Roman Catholic Diocese of Reconquista is located in the city of Reconquista, in the north of the province of Santa Fe, in Argentina.

History
On 11 February 1957 Pope Pius XII founded the Diocese of Reconquista from territory taken from the Archdiocese of Santa Fe.  It lost territory to the Diocese of Rafaela in 1961.

Bishops

Ordinaries
Juan José Iriarte (1957–1984) appointed, Archbishop of Resistencia
Fabriciano Sigampa (1985–1992) appointed, Bishop of La Rioja
Juan Rubén Martinez (1994–2000) appointed, Bishop of Posadas
Andrés Stanovnik, O.F.M. Cap. (2001–2007) appointed, Archbishop of Corrientes
Ramón Alfredo Dus (2008–2013) appointed, Archbishop of Resistencia
Ángel José Macín (2013–present)

Other priest of this diocese who became bishop
Dante Gustavo Braida Lorenzón, appointed Auxiliary Bishop of Mendoza in 2015

References

Reconquista
Reconquista
Reconquista
Reconquista